The 1996 Canada rugby union tour of Australia was a series of rugby union matches played during June 1996 in Australia by the Canada national rugby union team.

Results 
Scores and results list Canada's points tally first.

See also
 List of Canada national rugby union team test matches

References

Canada
Canada national rugby union team tours
Rugby union
tour
Rugby union tours of Australia
June 1996 sports events in Australia